La Pointe-de-l'Île is a federal electoral district in Quebec, Canada, that has been represented in the House of Commons of Canada since 2004. Its population in 2001 was 98,878.

The riding was created in 2003 from parts of Anjou—Rivière-des-Prairies, Hochelaga—Maisonneuve, and Mercier ridings.

Geography
The district includes the City of Montréal-Est, the neighbourhood of Pointe-aux-Trembles in the Borough of Rivière-des-Prairies–Pointe-aux-Trembles, and the eastern part of the neighbourhood of Longue-Pointe and the southern part of the neighbourhood of Mercier-Est in the Borough of Mercier–Hochelaga-Maisonneuve.

The neighbouring ridings are Hochelaga, Honoré-Mercier, Montcalm, Repentigny, Verchères—Les Patriotes, and Longueuil—Pierre-Boucher.

Demographics
According to the Canada 2016 Census

 Languages: (2016) 83.0% French, 3.5% Spanish, 2.6% English, 2.0% Creole, 1.9% Arabic, 1.3% Italian, 0.6% Portuguese, 0.6% Romanian, 0.5% Vietnamese, 0.5% Kabyle

History
The riding is located in Eastern Montreal, traditionally the power base of the Quebec sovereignty movement. It had long been reckoned as the Bloc Québécois' safest riding. However, in 2011, after the retirement of longtime MP Francine Lalonde, it fell to the New Democratic Party along with all of the other ridings in Eastern Montreal.

This riding lost territory to Hochelaga and gained territory from Honoré-Mercier during the 2012 electoral redistribution.

Member of Parliament

This riding has elected the following Members of Parliament:

Election results

See also
 List of Canadian federal electoral districts
 Past Canadian electoral districts

References

Campaign expense data from Elections Canada
2011 Results from Elections Canada
Riding history from the Library of Parliament

Notes

Federal electoral districts of Montreal
Rivière-des-Prairies–Pointe-aux-Trembles
Montréal-Est, Quebec
Mercier–Hochelaga-Maisonneuve